Nizhny Katrukh (Aşağı Qatrux) is a rural locality (a selo) in Rutulsky District, Republic of Dagestan, Russia. The population was 429 as of 2010. There are 4 streets.

Geography 
Nizhny Katrukh is located on the Samur ridge, near the Khirivalyu river, 35 km northwest of Rutul (the district's administrative centre) by road. Verkhny Katrukh and Arakul are the nearest rural localities.

Nationalities 
Azerbaijanis live there.

References 

Rural localities in Rutulsky District